The 2008 European Short Track Speed Skating Championships took place between 18 and 20 January 2008 in Ventspils, Latvia.

Medal summary

Medal table

Men's events

Women's events

Participating nations

See also
Short track speed skating
European Short Track Speed Skating Championships

External links
Detailed results
Results overview
Results book

European Short Track Speed Skating Championships
European Short Track Speed Skating Championships
European
European Short Track Speed Skating Championships
Sport in Ventspils
International sports competitions hosted by Latvia